In enzymology, a benzyl-2-methyl-hydroxybutyrate dehydrogenase is an enzyme that catalyzes the chemical reaction

benzyl (2R,3S)-2-methyl-3-hydroxybutanoate + NADP+  benzyl 2-methyl-3-oxobutanoate + NADPH + H+

Thus, the two substrates of this enzyme are benzyl (2R,3S)-2-methyl-3-hydroxybutanoate and NADP+, whereas its 3 products are benzyl 2-methyl-3-oxobutanoate, NADPH, and H+.

This enzyme belongs to the family of oxidoreductases, specifically those acting on the CH-OH group of donor with NAD+ or NADP+ as acceptor.  The systematic name of this enzyme class is benzyl-(2R,3S)-2-methyl-3-hydroxybutanoate:NADP+ 3-oxidoreductase. This enzyme is also called benzyl 2-methyl-3-hydroxybutyrate dehydrogenase.

References

 

EC 1.1.1
NADPH-dependent enzymes
Enzymes of unknown structure